Newcastle is a city in and the county seat of Weston County, Wyoming, United States. The population was 3,374 at the 2020 census.

Geography 

Newcastle is located at  (43.853183, -104.209343). It is situated at the southwest edge of the Black Hills, at the intersection of U.S. routes 16 and 85.

Demographics

2010 census
As of the census of 2010, there were 3,532 people, 1,439 households, and 868 families living in the city. The racial makeup of the city was 94.6% White, 0.4% African American, 1.6% Native American, 0.3% Asian, 0.1% Pacific Islander, 1.0% from other races, and 2.0% from two or more races. Hispanic or Latino people of any race were 3.4% of the population.

There were 1,439 households, of which 27.2% had children under the age of 18 living with them, 47.0% were married couples living together, 8.9% had a female householder with no husband present, 4.4% had a male householder with no wife present, and 39.7% were non-families. 34.7% of all households were made up of individuals, and 13.3% had someone living alone who was 65 years of age or older. The average household size was 2.24 and the average family size was 2.86.

The median age in the city was 39.6 years. 22% of residents were under the age of 18; 8.9% were between the ages of 18 and 24; 25.7% were from 25 to 44; 27.2% were from 45 to 64; and 16.2% were 65 years of age or older. The gender makeup of the city was 53.9% male and 46.1% female.

2000 census
As of the census of 2000, there were 3,065 people, 1,253 households, and 844 families living in the city. The population density was 1,242.1 people per square mile (479.1/km2). There were 1,458 housing units at an average density of 590.9 per square mile (227.9/km2). The racial makeup of the city was 95.79% White, 0.13% African American, 1.44% Native American, 0.29% Asian, 1.01% from other races, and 1.34% from two or more races. Hispanic or Latino people of any race were 1.66% of the population.

There were 1,253 households, out of which 30.4% had children under the age of 18 living with them, 54.0% were married couples living together, 10.1% had a female householder with no husband present, and 32.6% were non-families. 28.4% of all households were made up of individuals, and 13.0% had someone living alone who was 65 years of age or older. The average household size was 2.35 and the average family size was 2.88.

In the city, the population was spread out, with 24.3% under the age of 18, 7.9% from 18 to 24, 24.7% from 25 to 44, 24.5% from 45 to 64, and 18.6% who were 65 years of age or older. The median age was 40 years. For every 100 females, there were 93.1 males. For every 100 females age 18 and over, there were 91.5 males.

The median income for a household in the city was $29,873, and the median income for a family was $36,929. Males had a median income of $31,222 versus $16,628 for females. The per capita income for the city was $15,378. About 7.5% of families and 11.4% of the population and 7.5% of families were below the poverty line, including 14.8% of those under the age of 18 and 15.7% of those 65 and older.

Government and infrastructure
The Wyoming Department of Corrections Wyoming Honor Conservation Camp & Boot Camp is located in Newcastle. The facility was operated by the Wyoming Board of Charities and Reform until that agency was dissolved as a result of a state constitutional amendment passed in November 1990.

The United States Postal Service operates the Newcastle Post Office.
The Weston County Senior Citizen Center provides paratransit service for Newcastle and its surroundings on weekdays, primarily for use by seniors.

Education
Public education in the city of Newcastle is provided by Weston County School District #1. The district's schools include Newcastle Elementary (split into two campuses for grades K–2 & 3–5), Newcastle Middle School (grades 6–8), and Newcastle High School (grades 9–12).

Newcastle has a public library, a branch of the Weston County Library System.

Climate
Newcastle experiences a dry continental climate (Köppen Dfa) with cold winters and hot, wet summers.

Arts and culture

The town boasts great walking trails. A historic tour starts at the Anna Miller Museum. Also included are the Greenwood Cemetery and a downtown historic district listed with the National Register of Historic Places. The "Serenity Trail" allows walkers to view wildlife in the area.

Notable people 
 Cindy Hill (born 1962), Wyoming Superintendent of Public Instruction 2011–2015, was reared in Newcastle
Frank Wheeler Mondell (1860–1939), United States Representative from Wyoming, helped establish Newcastle as a community and was its first mayor
 Edwin Keith Thomson (1919–1960), Wyoming politician

See also
 List of cities in Wyoming

References

External links

 
 Newcastle Chamber of Commerce

 
Cities in Wyoming
Cities in Weston County, Wyoming
County seats in Wyoming
Black Hills